Bolwick Hall is located at Marsham, Norfolk, 1 mile south of Aylsham.

History 
The hall is recorded in the Domesday Book of 1086 and given to King John I by Hugh de Boves and then passed to Henry de Bolevic. By 1872 the hall had only changed ownership on 11 occasions. The present exterior was added in c.1800. Architecture such as Saxon and Tudor can be seen.

Gardens 
Landscaped gardens and parkland surrounding the late Georgian hall (not open to the public), are attributed to Humphry Repton. The gardens include a collection of mature trees, a working vegetable garden, woodland and lakeside walks. The ornamental lake was formed by the damming of The Mermaid a minor tributary of the River Bure to provide water for the Bolwick watermill. The garden is open to the public once a year under the National Gardens Scheme.

Bolwick watermill 
The watermill was an estate mill, originally belonging to the hall. The final structure was completed in 1812 and renovated in 1889. The building survived to 1965.

Notable residents 
 Gerard Anstruther Wathen CIE (1878-1958)  as entered  - " Wathen of Bolwick Hall formally of Beckenham Lodge " in Burke's Landed Gentry. Wathen was a Companion of the Order of the Indian Empire, principal of Khalsa College, Amritsar, India (1914 - 1924) and the headmaster of Hall School Hampstead, (1924-1955). He married Melicent, daughter of Charles Louis Buxton of Bolwick Hall.

References

External links
 Bolwick Hall

Gardens in Norfolk
Country houses in Norfolk
Gardens by Humphry Repton